Emilio José Palacios Luna (born 8 October 1982) is a Nicaraguan former footballer who played for Diriangén in the Primera División de Nicaragua.

Palacios is Nicaragua's all-time national team record goalscorer with 11 goals.

Club career
Palacios started his professional career at Diriangén and had a short spell with Parmalat. He moved abroad to join Salvadoran outfit Independiente in 2007, only to return to Nicaragua to play for Walter Ferretti, then Xilotepelt whom he helped promote to the top tier in June 2012. He returned to Diriangén in summer 2012.

He was the top scorer of the Nicaraguan League in the championships Apertura 2002 (scoring 15 goals for Parmalat), Apertura 2003 (17 goals for Diriangén) and Apertura 2004 (14 goals for Diriangén).

International career
Palacios made his debut for Nicaragua in an April 2001 friendly match against Belize and has earned a total of 26 caps, scoring 11 goals. He has represented his country in 3 FIFA World Cup qualification matches and played at the 2001,2003, 2007, and 2009 UNCAF Nations Cups.

He was the first Nicaraguan to score a hat-trick in an international competition, in February 2007, when Nicaragua won 4-2 against Belize, during the IX UNCAF Copa de Naciones. After a good performance in this event, he was contacted by Salvadoran side Independiente, and left Diriangen FC for the Salvadoran side.

His final international was a January 2009 UNCAF Nations Cup match against Guatemala.

International goals
Scores and results list Honduras' goal tally first.

References

External links

1982 births
Living people
People from Carazo Department
Association football forwards
Nicaraguan men's footballers
Nicaragua international footballers
Diriangén FC players
C.D. Walter Ferretti players
Nicaraguan expatriate footballers
Expatriate footballers in El Salvador
2001 UNCAF Nations Cup players
2003 UNCAF Nations Cup players
2007 UNCAF Nations Cup players
2009 UNCAF Nations Cup players